Zdeněk Koukal (born 14 March 1984) is a Czech football player currently playing for FC Viktoria Plzeň.

Koukal is a son of a former footballer, who played for Bohemians Prague. He started his football career in Germany, where his father was playing at that time. Since 1993, he played for Bohemians Prague. During subsequent years, he several times changed his teams. He played for Czech 2. Liga teams and Gambrinus liga sides FK Teplice and FK Viktoria Žižkov. In 2010, Koukal was transferred to FC Baník Ostrava.

External links
 
 
 Profile at Vysočina Jihlava website

1984 births
Living people
Czech footballers
Czech Republic under-21 international footballers
Czech First League players
Bohemians 1905 players
FK Teplice players
FC Vysočina Jihlava players
FK Viktoria Žižkov players
FC Baník Ostrava players
1. FK Příbram players
Association football defenders
Footballers from Prague